Stade Municipal de Vieux-Habitants is a football stadium in Vieux-Habitants, Guadeloupe. It has a capacity of 1,000  and is currently used by the Guadeloupe Division d'Honneur's reigning champions, JS Vieux-Habitants.
 In the wake of recent hurricanes, the stadium was renovated in 2004, costing a total of €6.94 million.

References

Football venues in Guadeloupe
Football in Guadeloupe